Bolshaya Omutnaya is a rural locality (a station) in Rabochy Posyolok Erofey Pavlovich of Skovorodinsky District, Amur Oblast, Russia. The population was 177 as of 2018.

Geography 
Bolshaya Omutnaya is located 133 km west of Skovorodino (the district's administrative centre) by road. Yerofey Pavlovich is the nearest rural locality.

References 

Rural localities in Skovorodinsky District